Dinesh Seneviratne (born 9 March 1978) is a Sri Lankan cricketer. He made his first-class debut in the 1997–98 season. He made his Twenty20 debut on 9 October 2005, for Lankan Cricket Club in the 2005–06 SLC Twenty20 Tournament. He made his List A debut on 1 November 2005, for Lankan Cricket Club in the 2005–06 Premier Limited Overs Tournament.

References

External links
 

1978 births
Living people
Sri Lankan cricketers
Lankan Cricket Club cricketers
Sebastianites Cricket and Athletic Club cricketers
Place of birth missing (living people)